Jayshreeba Bhikhubha Jadeja (born 9 January 1992) is a Gujarati cricketer. She plays for Saurashtra and West Zone. She has played 1 First-class, 36 List A and 35 Women's Twenty20 matches. She made her debut in major domestic cricket on 21 November 2008 in a one-day match against Maharashtra.

References

External links

1992 births
Saurashtra women cricketers
West Zone women cricketers
Living people